Despréaux is a French surname. People with that name include:

 Claude-Jean-François Despréaux (1740s–1794), French violinist and revolutionary
 Jean-Étienne Despréaux (1748–1820), French ballet master 
 Nicolas Boileau-Despréaux (1636–1711), French poet and critic

See also
 The Tale of Despereaux

Surnames of French origin